XHCCG-FM is a radio station on 104.1 FM in Monclova, Coahuila. It is owned by Radio Medios de Monclova and is known as La Furia del Norte with a grupera format.

History
XHCCG received its concession on November 11, 1996. It was originally slated to operate on 104.7 MHz from Cuatrociénegas and was owned by Radio Medios founder Melchor Sánchez Dovalina. The station later moved into Monclova and took the 104.1 MHz frequency.

References

Radio stations in Coahuila